Thomas or Tom Oliver may refer to:
Thomas Oliver (architect) (1791–1857), classical architect active in Newcastle upon Tyne, England
Thomas Oliver (Canadian politician) (1821–1880), Canadian businessman and political figure
Thomas Oliver (engineer), engineer who invented the first machine for forging bolts in England
Thomas Oliver (farmer) (died 1991), IRA murder victim
Thomas Oliver (lieutenant governor) (1733–1815), last Royal Lieutenant-Governor of Massachusetts
Thomas Oliver (logician) (died 1624), English logician writing at the end of the 16th century
Thomas Oliver (physician) (1853–1946), Scottish physician and industrial hygienist
Thomas Oliver (religious writer) (1871–1946), teacher, magazine editor, author and wool expert
Thomas Oliver (Salem witch trials) (1601–1679), husband of Bridget Bishop, victim of the Salem witchcraft trials
Thomas Oliver (songwriter), Tyneside poet and songwriter
Thomas Oliver (1852–1909), Canadian/American typewriter inventor; see Oliver Typewriter Company
Tom Oliver (baseball) (1903–1988), center fielder for the Boston Red Sox
Tom Oliver (born 1938), English actor
Tom Oliver (Big Brother), contestant on Big Brother 2009 (UK)
Tommy Oliver, fictional character from Power Rangers

See also
Tom Olliver (1812–1874), English jockey and racehorse trainer
Thomas Olivers (1725–1799), Welsh preacher and hymn-writer
Stantley Thomas-Oliver, American football cornerback
Tom Olivar (born 1963), Philippine film and television actor